These People may refer to:
 These People (Richard Ashcroft album), 2016
 These People (The Dicks album), 1985
 "These People", a song by  Sheppard, from the 2014 album Bombs Away